No. 354 Squadron RAF was a general reconnaissance squadron of the Royal Air Force during the Second World War.

History
No. 354 squadron was first formed at Drigh Road, Karachi on 10 May 1943 as part of Coastal Command, and was posted to RAF Station Cuttack on 17 August 1943, where it received Liberator Mk.V bombers.  Detachments of the squadron were located at Sigiriya and St Thomas Mount.  The squadron redeployed to Minneriya in Ceylon on 12 October 1944, with detachments at Kankesanturai and Cuttack, and returned to Cuttack whilst maintaining a detachment at Kankesanterai in January 1945, where they received the Liberator Mk.VI.  The squadron was disbanded on 18 May 1945 at RAF Cuttack.

Aircraft operated

Squadron airfields

Commanding officer

References

Notes

Bibliography

External links
 RAF Commands, No. 354 Squadron RAF movement and equipment history
 No. 354 Squadron history

354 Squadron
Aircraft squadrons of the Royal Air Force in World War II
Maritime patrol aircraft units and formations
Military units and formations established in 1943
Military units and formations disestablished in 1945